Kahak (also Romanized as Kohak) is a village in Do Dehak Rural District, in the Central District of Delijan County, Markazi Province, Iran. At the 2006 census, its population was 116, in 40 families.

During Safavid times, the village enjoyed some importance, and was the site of a large caravanserai, now in ruins.

During the late medieval period, the village was the centre of the Qasim-Shahi line of Nizari Isma'ili imams, which transferred its residence from nearby Anjudan to Kahak during the early imamate of Shah Nizar II (1680–1722). His mausoleum in the western end of the village survives to this day, although a restoration in 1966 destroyed many of its original elements and fixtures. The Nizari imams abandoned Kahak for Kerman Province in the mid-18th century, but Shah Khalil Allah III (1792–1817) re-established himself there shortly into his imamate until 1815, when he moved to Yazd. Kahak was the birthplace of Shah Khalil Allah's son and successor, Aga Khan I, in 1804.

References 

Populated places in Delijan County
History of Nizari Isma'ilism